"I'm a Man Not a Boy" is the second single by British singer and actor Chesney Hawkes. Written by Hawkes, Nigel Hinton and John Wesley Harding, and produced by Alan Shacklock, it was included in the film Buddy's Song, with Hawkes as Buddy and Roger Daltrey (of rock band the Who) as his father. The single entered the UK Singles Chart at  37 and climbed to a peak position of No. 27 a week later, making it the second of two of Hawkes' singles to enter the top 40.

Track listings

Charts

References

External links
 

1991 songs
1991 singles
Chesney Hawkes songs
Chrysalis Records singles
Songs written by Chesney Hawkes